The Xianxian Mosque is a mosque in Yuexiu District, Guangzhou City, Guangdong Province, China. It is the largest mosque in Guangzhou.

History
The mosque was originally built in 629 during the Tang Dynasty. It is also called the Hui-hui cemetery as it was a cemetery honoring 40 famous Arabic Muslim missionaries who were buried there.

Architecture

The mosque was built with Ming Dynasty architecture style and covers an area of 1,860 m2 including the 1,077 m2 of constructed area. It consists of prayer hall, pavilion, wing room and other facilities. The prayer hall is a two-story building capable of accommodating 1,000 worshipers.

The interior has a garden style look, with many trees and flowers inside the mosque. The cemetery is located on the roof.

Transportation
The mosque is accessible within walking distance east of Guangzhou railway station.

See also
 Islam in China
 List of mosques in China

References

Mosques in China
Religious buildings and structures in Guangzhou
7th-century establishments in China
7th-century mosques
Yuexiu District
Mosques completed in 629